Joi Lansing (born Joy Rae Brown, April 6, 1929 – August 7, 1972) was an American model, film and television actress, and nightclub singer. She was noted for her pin-up photos and roles in B-movies, as well as a prominent role in the famous opening "tracking shot" in Orson Welles' 1958 crime drama Touch of Evil.

Lansing was often cast in roles similar to those played by her contemporaries Jayne Mansfield and Mamie Van Doren. She frequently was clad in skimpy costumes and bikinis that accentuated her figure (34D bust), but she never posed nude. Publicity reports claimed that Lansing practiced yoga for relaxation and was a devout Mormon.

Early life
Lansing was born at Salt Lake Regional Medical Center in Salt Lake City, Utah, in 1929 to Jack Glen Brown (also known as Glen Jack Brown and Glenn Jack Brown), a shoe salesman and orchestra musician, and Virginia Grace (née Shupe) Brown, a housewife.

She was later known by her stepfathers' surnames, i.e. Wassmansdorff and Loveland. In 1940, her family moved to Los Angeles, where her half-brother, Larry Vernon Loveland, stepsister Tammera Loveland, and stepbrother Kim Loveland were born. She began modeling at the age of 14 and was signed to an MGM contract; she completed high school on the studio lot.

Career

Films

Lansing's film career began in 1948, and in 1952 she played an uncredited role in MGM's Singin' in the Rain. She received top billing in Hot Cars (1956), a crime drama involving a stolen-car racket. It could be argued, however, that the biggest single break of Lansing's career had come the year before, when, from 1955 through 1959, in roughly 125 episodes, she portrayed the character Shirley Swanson on the Robert Cummings sitcom, Love That Bob. In 1958, she appeared in the famous opening sequence of Orson Welles's Touch of Evil as Zita, the dancer who dies in a car explosion at the end of the extended tracking shot after exclaiming to a border guard "I keep hearing this ticking noise inside my head!"

She had a brief role as an astronaut's girlfriend in sci-fi parody Queen of Outer Space (1958) and had fourth billing in the science fiction feature The Atomic Submarine (1959). During the 1960s, she starred in short musical films for the Scopitone video-jukebox system. Her songs included "The Web of Love" and "The Silencer".

In 1964, producer Stanley Todd discussed a film project with Lansing, tentatively titled Project 22, with location shooting planned in Yugoslavia, and with George Hamilton and Geraldine Chaplin named to the cast. The film never was made.

Lansing played "Lola" in the romantic comedy Marriage on the Rocks (1965), with a cast that included Frank Sinatra, Deborah Kerr, and Dean Martin. Lansing previously had appeared in Sinatra's drama A Hole in the Head (1959) and in Martin's comedy Who Was That Lady? (1960). She turned down the chance to replace Jayne Mansfield in  The Ice House (a 1969 horror film), and instead appeared opposite Basil Rathbone (in his last film appearance) and John Carradine in Hillbillys in a Haunted House (1967), as Mamie Van Doren's replacement. Her last film was Bigfoot (1970).

Recordings
Lansing started singing in nightclubs in the early 1960s, and her performances are documented in several trade magazines. She performed with the Xavier Cugat orchestra and briefly toured with Les Paul, but little is known about the songs she actually recorded. Apparently, while starring on Love That Bob, she recorded a 45 r.p.m. single on the small REO record label in 1957: "Love Me/What's It Gonna Be" (REO #1007). In 1962, she recorded six to eight sides at Que Recorders in Los Angeles. These turned up at auction and were acetates of four songs each (with two songs duplicated on the second acetate). It is unknown whether these tracks were released on an album. Both acetates list the same identifying number of #4-8351. The songs recorded on February 23, 1962, were "Masquerade Is Over", "All of You" (Cole Porter), "The One I Love" (which was most likely "The One I Love (Belongs to Somebody Else)", and "Who Cares?" (George and Ira Gershwin). On April 30, 1962, the songs recorded were "Feel So Young" (which was probably "You Make Me Feel So Young"), "Dream (1944 song)", "Masquerade", and "All Of You". It was reported in Cashbox magazine on April 17, 1965, that Lansing was recording an album for RCA records with Jimmie Haskell (and suggested that it should be titled Joi to the World of Jazz), but nothing further is known about this project.

Television

Lansing appeared in The Adventures of Wild Bill Hickok, The Jack Benny Program, It's a Great Life, I Love Lucy, Bat Masterson, Where's Raymond?, State Trooper, The People's Choice, Richard Diamond, Private Detective, The Lucy-Desi Comedy Hour, Sugarfoot, This Man Dawson, Maverick, Perry Mason, The Joey Bishop Show, Petticoat Junction, The Mothers-in-Law, and The Adventures of Ozzie and Harriet, and had a recurring role in The Beverly Hillbillies. 

She named Ozzie Nelson as possessing the greatest sex appeal of any actor with whom she worked. The two played a love scene in a 1956 Fireside Theater drama titled Shoot the Moon. Lansing had a recurring role as Shirley Swanson in The Bob Cummings Show or Love That Bob (1956–59). She appeared in several episodes as a busty model who was the foil for photographer Bob Collins, Cummings' series name. The series ran for 173 episodes. 

Lansing appeared as herself in a 1956 I Love Lucy season 6 episode, "Desert Island". In 1957, she played Vera Payson in the Perry Mason episode "The Case of the Crimson Kiss". She achieved some distinction for beating out Lois Lane (Noel Neill) to marry Superman (George Reeves) as the title character in "Superman's Wife", a 1958 episode of The Adventures of Superman.

What was possibly Lansing's best television role may have been her least-seen as the leading lady in The Fountain of Youth, a Peabody Award-winning unsold television pilot directed by Orson Welles for Desilu in 1956 and broadcast on the Colgate Theatre two years later. The half-hour film remains available for public viewing at the Paley Center for Media in New York City and Los Angeles.

She appeared in a 1960 episode of “The Untouchables” entitled “The Noise of Death,” playing a character named Georgina Jones. In the 1960–61 season of Klondike, Lansing appeared as Goldie with Ralph Taeger, James Coburn, and Mari Blanchard. In 1960, she appeared as Evelyn in the "Election Bet" episode of the Mr. Lucky TV series (season 1, episode 34). In May 1963, Lansing appeared in Falcon Frolics '63. The broadcast honored the men stationed at the Vandenberg Air Force Base. 

She appeared in six episodes of The Beverly Hillbillies in the role of Gladys Flatt, the glamorous wife of bluegrass musician Lester Flatt.  

Lansing has a star on the Hollywood Walk of Fame in Los Angeles for her contributions to television.

Personal life
Lansing married Jerome "Jerry" Safron in 1950; the marriage was annulled. 

She married Lance Fuller in 1951; the couple were divorced in 1953. 

In 1960 she married Stan Todd. 

Lansing died from breast cancer on August 7, 1972, at St. John's Hospital, Santa Monica, California. She had been treated surgically for the disease two years earlier. She also suffered from severe anemia. While some press accounts gave her age as 37, she was actually 43 years old.

Joi Lansing: A Body to Die For, a 2015 memoir about Lansing's last three years, was written by her companion Alexis Hunter.

In popular culture

A highly fictionalized version of Lansing appears in James Ellroy's 2021 novel Widespread Panic.

Filmography

Features

 When a Girl's Beautiful (1947) - Model (uncredited)
 Linda, Be Good (1947) - Cameo Girl (uncredited)
 The Counterfeiters (1948) - Caroline - Art Model
 Easter Parade (1948) - Hat Model / Showgirl (uncredited)
 Julia Misbehaves (1948) - Mannequin (uncredited)
 Blondie's Secret (1948) - Bathing Girl in Dream (uncredited)
 Take Me Out to the Ball Game (1949) - Girl on Train (uncredited)
 Neptune's Daughter (1949) - Linda (uncredited)
 The Girl from Jones Beach (1949) - Model (uncredited)
 In the Good Old Summertime (1949) - Pretty Girl (uncredited)
 Key to the City (1950) - Miss Garbage Truck (uncredited)
 Pier 23 (1951) - The Cocktail Waitress
 On the Riviera (1951) - Marilyn Turner (uncredited)
 FBI Girl (1951) - Susan
 Two Tickets to Broadway (1951) - Showgirl (uncredited)
 Singin' in the Rain (1952) - Chorus Girl (uncredited)
 Glory Alley (1952) - Chorus Girl (uncredited)
 The Merry Widow (1952) - Girl at Maxim's (uncredited)
 The French Line (1953) - Model (uncredited)
 Son of Sinbad (1955) - Harem Girl (uncredited)
 Finger Man (1955) - Blonde in Bar (uncredited)
 Terror at Midnight (1956) - Hazel (uncredited)
 The Brave One (1956) - Marion Randall
 Hot Cars (1956) - Karen Winter
 Hot Shots (1956) - Connie Forbes
 Touch of Evil (1958) - Zita
 Queen of Outer Space (1958) - Larry's Girl (uncredited)
 A Hole in the Head (1959) - Dorine
 It Started with a Kiss (1959) - Checkroom Girl (uncredited)
 But Not for Me (1959) - Blonde Bathing Beauty (uncredited)
 The Atomic Submarine (1959) - Julie
 Who Was That Lady? (1960) - Florence Coogle
 Marriage on the Rocks (1965) - Lola
 Hillbillys in a Haunted House (1967) - Boots Malone
 Bigfoot (1970) - Joi Landis

Short subjects

 Super Cue Men (1937)
 The House of Tomorrow (1949), created by Tex Avery - "The Girl" on television (uncredited) 
 Joe McDoakes
"So You Want to Go to a Nightclub" (1954) - Lorna Lamour (uncredited)
"So You're Taking in a Roomer" (1954) - Blonde Roomer (uncredited)
"So You Want to Be a V.P." (1955) - Miss Poindexter - Secretary (uncredited)
"So You Want to Be a Policeman" (1955) - Blonde Getting Ticket (uncredited)
"So You Think the Grass Is Greener" (1956) - Geraldine Backspace (uncredited)
 The Fountain of Youth (1956), scripted & directed by Orson Welles - Carolyn Coates
 The Starmaker (1957), starring Bette Davis, on television - Mrs. Barclay Alexander

Further reading
 Hunter, Alexis Joi Lansing - A Body to Die For - A Love Story (BearManor Media 15 June 2015) 
 Charleston Gazette, "Sexy Blonde Yearns for Drama", June 13, 1957, page 4.
 Chronicle Telegram, "Actress Joi Lansing to be buried Friday", August 9, 1972, page 6.
 Long Beach Press-Telegram, "Her Voice Isn't Bad, Either", May 7, 1965, page 37.
 Los Angeles Times, "Filmland Events", May 21, 1963, page C7.
 Los Angeles Times, "Filmland Events", December 25, 1964, page D16.
 Los Angeles Times, "Filmland Events", January 1, 1965, page C6.
 Los Angeles Times, "Hollywood Calendar", April 25, 1965, page N8.
 Los Angeles Times, "Humor, Social Commentary", April 26, 1965, page D10.
 Los Angeles Times, "Talent Heads Downtown", July 12, 1966, page C8.
 San Mateo Times, "Joi Lansing Turns Up and Talks About Men Actors", October 13, 1956, page 22.

References

External links

 
 
 Joi Lansing timeline
 Joy Lansing on the cover of Life magazine, March 28, 1949
 Joi Lansing at Glamour Girls of the Silver Screen 
 The Fountain of Youth on YouTube

1929 births
1972 deaths
20th-century American actresses
20th-century American singers
Age controversies
American film actresses
Latter Day Saints from California
American television actresses
Deaths from breast cancer
Actresses from Los Angeles
Actresses from Salt Lake City
Deaths from cancer in California
Nightclub performers
20th-century American women singers
Latter Day Saints from Utah